A Hell of a Woman is a 1954 novel by Jim Thompson.
It has been adapted for the screen by Alain Corneau and Georges Pérec as Série noire, released in 1979.

Plot
Frank "Dolly" Dillon hates his job of working collections for Pay-E-Zee Stores. He loathes his wife, Joyce, and has an account balance that barely lets him pay the bills each month.

Working door-to-door one day, Dolly crosses paths with a beautiful young woman, Mona who is being forced by her aunt to do things that she does not want to with men she does not know. Mona wants out any way that she can.

References

1954 American novels
Novels by Jim Thompson
English-language novels
American crime novels
American novels adapted into films